500 Miles to Memphis is a punk rock americana band from Cincinnati, OH. Their music is a cross-genre blend of punk rock, americana, bluegrass, and country. Ryan Malott formed the band in 2003. Since then they have released six studio albums, which have won multiple awards, and been licensed to numerous movies, TV shows, and video games.

They have actively toured the United States since 2003.

500 Miles to Memphis consists of Ryan Malott (vocs, guitar, banjo), David Rhodes Brown (lap steel), Noah Sugarman (bass, vocs), Kevin Hogle (drums), Aaron Whalen (guitar, vocs), Nate Hickey(guitar, mandolin, vocs), and Luke Zacherl(violin).

History

2002–2003
At the age of 19, Ryan Malott started the band under the name of Underclass Motto which was then changed 500 Miles to Memphis.  The name and the band were born out of a move from Cincinnati, OH to Dallas, TX in 2002 where Malott and friends hoped to start a punk band. In 2003 Malott formed the group and played their first show near the University of Cincinnati.

2004–2005
David Rhodes Brown and Noah Sugarman joined and helped the group take on a more mature sound and establish themselves as a serious act. Shortly after, Malott and co. signed with a local record label called 3rd Silo Records. They released their first full-length album, self-titled, and received a Cincinnati Entertainment Award for best “Roots/Folk/Americana”.  The band began touring and wrote what would become, Sunshine In a Shot Glass.

2006–2007
Malott met a local drummer, Kevin Hogle, who was touring with MOTH at the time.  Originally, Hogle was hired as a session player on the record until Malott could find a permanent drummer.  In the spring of 2006, 500MTM began recording the album, Sunshine In a Shot Glass. Once they had rough mixes of the album, Malott began sending demos to national labels with all passing except for Deep Elm Records. In May 2007, they released Sunshine In a Shot Glass and hit the road once again. At this point, Kevin Hogle had become a full-time member, solidifying the band's lineup.

For many years following, Noah Sugarman played lead guitar and Jeff Snyder joined on bass.

2008–2012
There were many lineup changes, but the core members, Ryan Malott, Noah Sugarman, Kevin Hogle, David Rhodes Brown, stayed together. In 2010, 500MTM cut We’ve Built Up to Nothing. Shortly after the album’s release, Aaron Whalen joined on lead guitar moving Noah Sugarman back to his original position on bass.

2013–2017
500MTM decided to take some time off to sober up and concentrate on other projects. In 2014, the band reunited for another album, Stand There and Bleed, which was backed by their friends and fans through Kickstarter. It was a self-released album recorded by Ashley Shepherd at Audiogrotto.

2018–2019
Malott and co. clear-headed and more driven than ever to create music, started doing regional tours and pre-production on the album "Blessed Be the Damned". For the first time in their careers, Malott and Sugarman decided to start writing together. In May 2018 the boys of 500 jumped in the studio to record with engineer Adam Pleiman and producer John Pedigo.  Philip W. Peeples of Old 97s joined the band for a few tracks adding percussion to the songs "Save Me" and "I'm a Bastard"

2019–2020 
Their 5th studio album, "Blessed Be the Damned" was released on Jan. 26th, 2019 and dubbed "one of the first must-have records of 2019" by New Noise Magazine.  Their album spent 5 weeks on the NACC Top 200 and 4 weeks on the FMQB SubModern Top 200 Albums.  In May 2019, 500 Miles to Memphis signed a deal with Vinnie Fiorello at Paper + Plastick Records to release a vinyl record on August 9, 2019.

2021 
2020 was spent writing and recording in Ryan Malott's basement.  After a year of work, the band released "Hard to Love" with Paper+Plastick Records on October 28th, 2021.  This was the first completely DIY recoding the band has made.  It was tracked, mixed, and mastered by Ryan Malott.

Awards
500 Miles to Memphis
 Winner of the 2005 Cincinnati Entertainment Award for best Roots/Americana/Folk
 Nominated for the 2006 CEA for best Rock
 Winner of the 2007 CEA for best Live Act
 Winner of the 2007 CEA for best Rock
 Nominated for the 2007 CEA for Album of The Year
 Nominated for the 2007 CEA for Artist of the Year
 Winner or the 2008 CEA for best Rock
 Nominated for the 2010 CEA for Album of the Year
 Winner of the 2011 CEA for Best Live Act
 Winner of the 2012 CEA for Best Live Act
 Winner of the 2013 CEA for Best Live Act
 Nominated for the 2015 CEA for Album of the Year

Licensing
500MTM's music has been licensed to multiple movies and TV shows, including:
Travis Pastrana 199 Lives
Kid Rock"Under-rated and Unsung"
MTV's Nitro Circus
MTV's Teen Mom
Rock Band the video game
Marlboro's bands on the run

Band members

Current members
Ryan Malott - vocals, guitar, banjo (2003–present)
Noah Sugarman - bass, vocals (2005–present)
Aaron Whalen - guitar, vocals (2010–present)
Kevin Hogle - drums (2007–present)
David Rhodes Brown - lap steel (2006–present)
Nate Hickey - vocals, mandolin, guitar (2018–present)
Luke Zacherl - violin (2020–present)

Past members
Joshua Murphy - vocals, guitar (2014–2018)
Jeff Snyder - bass (2007–2010)
Elaina Brown - keyboard, vocals (2009–2010)
Stephen Kuffner - guitar, vocals (2007–2009)
Jason Gallagher - guitar
Wade Owens - bass (2003–2005)
Lee Steele - drums
Brett Davis - drums (live/touring)
Brian Davis - guitar (live/touring)
Bryan Poindexter - drums
Wasabi Hansen - guitar, vocals
Aaron Hostetler - guitar, vocals
Sean Duley - drums
Ben Wirsching - drums
Greg Tudor - backup vocals, guitar (2013-04-12, Newport, KY, The Southgate House Revival)

Session musicians
Paul Patterson - fiddle (2007)
Annalyse McCoy - vocals (2007)

Discography

Studio albums
(2005) 500 Miles to Memphis  (3rd Silo Records)
(2007) Sunshine in a Shot Glass (Deep Elm Records)
(2010) We’ve Built Up to Nothing (Self-released)
(2014) Stand There and Bleed (Self-released)
(2018) Basement Bluegrass Sessions EP (Self-released)
(Jan 2019) Blessed Be the Damned (Self-released)
(August 2019) Blessed Be the Damned (Paper + Plastick Records)
(October 2021) Hard to Love (Paper + Plastick Records)

Live albums
(2011) Live at the Historic Southgate House
(2018) Revival (Self-released)

References

Grever, Nick (February 28, 2010). "Cincinnati’s own 500 Miles to Memphis". The News Record.
"500 Miles To Memphis - Four Cincinnati Entertainment Awards Nominations!".

External links
500 Miles to Memphis at YouTube
CincyMusic Profile

Musical groups established in 2003
Musical groups from Cincinnati
Americana music groups
American alternative country groups
Punk rock groups from Ohio
Indie rock musical groups from Ohio